Beer in Wales can be traced to the 6th century. Since the 2000s, there has been a growing microbrewery industry in Wales.

History
At least as early as the 6th century, the Druidic legendary person Ceridwen is associated with cauldrons and intoxicating preparations of grain in herbs in many poems of Taliesin, particularly the Hanes Taliesin. This preparation, Gwîn a Bragawd, is said to have brought "science, inspiration and immortality".

The Welsh Triads attribute the introduction of brewing grains barley and wheat to Coll, and name Llonion in Pembrokeshire as the source of the best barley, while Maes Gwenith in Gwent produces superior wheat and bees.

The Anglo-Saxon Chronicle for 852 records a distinction between "fine ale" and Welsh ale, also called bragawd. Bragawd, also called braggot, is somewhat between mead and what we today think of as ale. Saxon-period Welsh ale was a heady, strong beverage, made with spices such as cinnamon, ginger and clove as well as herbs and honey. Bragawd was often prepared in monasteries, with Tintern Abbey and the Friary of Carmarthen producing the beverage until Henry VIII dissolved the monasteries in 1536.

In the Laws of Hywel Dda, meanwhile, a distinction is drawn between bragawd and cwrwf, with bragawd being worth twice as much. Bragawd in this context is a fermented drink based on cwrwf to which honey, sweet wort, and ginger have been added.

Welsh beer is noted as a distinct style as late as 1854, with a recipe made solely from pale malt and hops described in a recipe book of the time.

Wales, along with the rest of Britain, came under the influence of the temperance movement, along with a burgeoning Welsh moral code based on Presbyterian and other Non-conformist beliefs in relation to alcohol. This rested against a background of places where there has historically been a lot of heavy industry such as coal mining in south Wales and the north east. This has given some people the impression that all Welsh beers have been very weak. However, as with beers all over Britain, alcohol percentages vary.

Wrexham was one of the first places in the UK to brew lager. Homesick German immigrant brothers from Saxony started the process in 1882.  Its demise came in 2000, when the site of Wrexham Lager was sold and subsequently demolished.

Investment by the Welsh Development Agency has helped establish a large number of breweries in Wales in recent years.

In the 1930s, Felinfoel Brewery was the first brewery in the UK to produce and sell beer in cans.  

The largest brewer and packager of beer in Wales by far is the Budweiser Brewing Group (BBG) Brewery in Magor.  The brewery was built in 1979 by the Whitbread brewing group and is now operated by the Budweiser Brewing Group, part of AB-InBev the world's largest brewer.  The brewery is one of the largest in the UK producing over 5 Million hectare litres every year.

In 2012, CAMRA predicted that the number of microbreweries in Wales is set to carry on rising as the pub industry deals with continued closures.

Tiny Rebel brewery won CAMRA's 2015 Supreme Champion Beer of Britain for its Cwtch Welsh Red Ale.

List of notable Welsh breweries

See also

 Food and drink industry of Wales
 Champion Beer of Wales
 Beer and breweries by region
 Beer in the United Kingdom
 Welsh cuisine
 English beer
 Beer in Northern Ireland
 Scottish beer
 Irish beer

References

External links
 Society of Independent Brewers
 CAMRA

 
Wales